Codification may refer to:
Codification (law), the process of preparing and enacting a legal code
Codification (linguistics), the process of selecting, developing and prescribing a model for standard language usage
Accounting Standards Codification, the collection of US Generally Accepted Accounting Principles produced by the Financial Accounting Standards Board
NATO Codification System, the official program under which equipment components and parts of the military supply systems are uniformly named, described and classified 
 Codification of Knowledge means a system-oriented method for creation of Explicit knowledge